University of Oran, or Es Sénia University, is a university located in western Algeria in the wilaya of Oran. It was established in November 1961 as part of the University of Algiers. On April 13, 1965, it was made a separate campus, and on December 20, 1967, it became an independent university. It was the first university established after the independence of Algeria.

Library 
The library holds 200,000 volumes.

See also 
 List of universities in Algeria
 University Hospital of Oran

References

External links
 Official website 

1961 establishments in Algeria
Oran
Buildings and structures in Oran
Libraries established in 1961